Operation Martillo is a multi-national anti drug operation that began on 15 January 2012, and "aims to combat international drug trafficking, and promote peace, stability in Central and South America", according to the U.S. Southern Command, as one of the public institutions involved in it.   It is a defense project led by the United States Southern Command with help of multi-national forces from Latin American and European countries. News coverage of their activities and results reach back to 2012 and up to 2020, but mainly from defense focused media.

Command 
The United States Southern Command's (SOUTHCOM) Joint Interagency Task Force South (JIATF-South), based in Key West, Florida

National forces

Belize
Land based support by the Belize Defense Force and Police with additional support from Canada.

Canada 
The Canadian participation in the operation, which began in 2006 has been given the code name Operation Caribbe given the object of eliminating illegal trafficking in the Caribbean Sea and the eastern Pacific Ocean by organized crime and includes air and sea forces.

Colombia 

The world’s largest producer of cocaine. A DH-8 aircraft employed in Operation Martillo crashed in Colombia in October 2013 resulting in the death of three Americans and one Panamanian operatives.

In May 2015, Colombia announced it was stopping using a controversial herbicide to destroy plantations of coca following a warning by the World Health Organization (WHO) that glyphosate is "probably carcinogenic".

Costa Rica 
A major conduit through which the cocaine traffic moves towards the United States with the Costa Rica Security Ministry predicting a huge increase to 1,700 tons moving through the country in 2016.

El Salvador 
Granting permission for U.S. forces to use El Salvador as a base in the hunt for illegal drug shipments has allowed groups like Patrol Squadron 8 to fly missions from the country.

Guatemala 
Land based operations, with the country permitting US Marines to join in the fight against drugs.

Honduras 
The Honduran Navy and US Coast Guard intercepted a sinking self-propelled semi-submersible vessel in March 2012.

Netherlands 

The Royal Netherlands Navy deployed ships, with aircraft from the Dutch Caribbean Coast Guard. A parallel operation Operation Caribbean Venture under the command of the Netherlands Forces in the Caribbean, who works closely with JIATF-South and has the same objectives as Operation Martillo.  and  have successfully participated in the operation.

Nicaragua 
Nicaraguan army small craft, assisted by the US Coast Guard intercepted US $32 million worth of cocaine in June 2012, and a further 9.2 million in November 2014.

Panama 
In 2012 Panama authorities seized 15.5 tons of drugs. In April 2013 a further US $242 million of cocaine was seized on a go-fast boat.

Spain 

Spain provides ships, aircraft, and liaison officers.

United Kingdom 
Royal Navy resources undertaking maritime security operations.

United States 
In addition to SOUTHCOM, the United States Coast Guard, United States Navy, United States Marine Corps and United States Air Forces all provide resources for the operation as well as Drug Enforcement and Law Enforcement Agencies. In December of 2022 the USNS Comfort arrived in Haiti.

Results 
Between January 2012 and April 2013, the operation intercepted 171 tons of cocaine and 28,000 pounds of marijuana; detained 411 criminal suspects; recovered US $7.4 million in laundered cash; and seized or destroyed 139 speedboats, fishing vessels, aircraft, pangas, and Drug-trafficking Submersibles. 

Between January 2012 and May 2015, 515 tons of cocaine and 117,754 pounds of marijuana have been seized, worth US $8 billion to drug organizations. It has also led to the arrest of at least 1,348 people.

Between January 2012 and February 2017, 693 tons of cocaine, US $25 million in cash, 581 vessels and aircraft detained and 1,863 detainees arrested.

Difficulties and solutions 
"Because of asset shortfalls, we’re unable to get after 74 percent of suspected maritime drug smuggling," Southern Command Cmdr. Marine Gen. John Kelly was quoted as saying in 2014. In 2015 there was a 50% increase in the number of US cutters and an increase in maritime aircraft patrols. (1,426 maritime drug movements were documented in 2014, JIATF-South was only able to target 383).

Between October 2014 and April 2015, 64% of all seizures and disruptions involved a non US nation’s participation. Allied and Partner Nations vessels and aircraft often being used to spot, identify and monitor potential smugglers before passing the information to US intercepts.

The United Nations Office on Drugs and Crime (UNOCD) estimate the 2013 annual world production of cocaine at between 660 and 900 tons. Seizures in Operation Martillo rising from 78 tons in 2012 to 162 tons in 2013. UNOCD indicating in 2015 an increased production in Columbia of 44% and Costa Rica estimating a dramatic rise in world production in 2016.

References 

History of drug control
Military operations involving Canada
Military operations involving France
Military operations involving Great Britain
Military operations involving Spain
Military operations involving the United States